The Batillus was a supertanker built in 1976 by Chantiers de l'Atlantique at Saint-Nazaire for the French branch of Shell Oil. The first vessel of the Batillus class, she was, together with her sister ships Bellamya, Pierre Guillaumat and Prairial, one of the biggest ships in the world, surpassed in size only by Seawise Giant (later Jahre Viking, Happy Giant and Knock Nevis) built in 1976, and extended in 1981, although the four ships of the Batillus class had a larger gross tonnage.

History 
The contract to build the Batillus class supertankers was signed on April 6, 1971, and the first sheet metal was cut in January 1975. Meanwhile, the oil shock caused by the Yom Kippur War in October 1973, resulted in higher oil prices and reduction of imports from industrialized countries. The cancellation of the order had been seriously considered, but Shell concluded that it was better to continue, mostly to not put the shipyard in very difficult position with withdrawal of such a huge, already initiated project, (the work commitments were already well advanced, with extremely heavy cancellation charges) hoping also on better times in future.

The ship was completed and put in service in 1976, simultaneously with new, purposely built, oil terminal Antifer, near Le Havre, one of very few ports in the world capable of accommodating Batillus class tankers. Her first captain was Roger Priser. She made a total of 25 voyages between the Persian Gulf and northern Europe, and one-off sail between the Persian Gulf and Curaçao in June–July 1977, a total of 20 dockings to Antifer. In the Gulf, oil terminals that served were Mina al Fahal (Oman), Halul island (Qatar), Kharg Island (Iran), Ras Tanura, Ras al-Ju'aymah (Saudi Arabia), Mina Al-Ahmadi and Sea Island (Kuwait). In Europe, the only other port of call was Europoort, Rotterdam, but there were also transloadings at sea to smaller units in England and Irish Sea.

The international oil market, however, did not improve, and while from 1977 to 1980, the Batillus performed four to five regular trips per year, she had a bit more than two trips in 1981 and three in 1982. From early November 1982, she was in permanent waiting for cargo at the Gulf entrance, until June 1983 when the last oil shipment was embarked. From August 22, 1983, to November 8, 1985, Batillus was moored at Vestnes, Norway. On October 17, 1985, Royal Dutch Shell decided to sell the ship for scrap, for less than $8 million. Her last voyage was from Vestnes to Kaohsiung (Taiwan) where she arrived on December 28, 1985, to be scrapped.

Technical data
Length overall was 414.22 m, beam 63.01 m, draft 28.50 m, deadweight tonnage 553,662 t, and gross tonnage 273,550 GT. The service speed was 16.7 knots, with fuel consumption of about 330 tonnes of heavy oil per day and fuel enough for 42 days.

The cargo was carried in 40 tanks with a total volume of 677,300 m3. They were divided into central and lateral tanks, whose dimensions were designed to considerably reduce the risk of pollution caused by collision or grounding. Ahead of the international standards of the time, the wing tanks had a maximum unit volume not exceeding 17,000 m3, which was reduced to 9,000 m3 in the most vulnerable parts of ship.

See also

Batillus class supertankers
Bellamya
Pierre Guillaumat
Prairial

References

External links
 Gallery and technical information at  aukevisser.nl 
 Building the Batillus at aukevisser.nl
 Article "Le Marin" du 5 juillet 1996 - Textes et photos : Gérard Cornier  
 Batillus at helderline.nl
 Les pétroliers de 550.000 tonnes Jacques Girard Gallery and various information 

Ships built in France
1976 ships
Tankers of France
Oil tankers
Shell plc